Eustachio Porcellotti (19th century) was a Florentine watchmaker.

He was known for having built, in the second half of the 19th century, several models illustrating the Galilean notion of applying the pendulum to the clock.

References

External links 

Italian scientific instrument makers
Year of birth missing
Year of death missing
Scientists from Florence